Albert-Pierre Sarraut (28 July 1872 – 26 November 1962) was a  French Radical politician, twice Prime Minister during the Third Republic.

Biography
Sarraut was born on 28 July 1872 in Bordeaux, Gironde, France.

On 14 March 1907 Sarraut, senator of Aude and under-secretary of state for the Interior, was ridiculed by Clemenceau for trying to plead the case of his electorate during the revolt of the Languedoc winegrowers. 
Clemenceau told Sarraut, "I know the South, it will all end with a banquet".
After massive demonstrations in the winegrowing region in June 1907 Clemenceau asked Sarraut to bring the leader Ernest Ferroul to the negotiating table. 
Ferroul told him: "When we have three million men behind us, we do not negotiate".
From 17 June 1907 the Midi was occupied by 22 regiments of infantry and 12 regiments of cavalry.
The gendarmerie was ordered to imprison the leaders of the demonstrations. 
Sarraut refused to endorse this policy and resigned from the government.

He was Governor-General of French Indochina, from 1912 to 1914 and from 1917 to 1919.
Although Sarraut was celebrated for native education reform, his motivation was an example of paternalism. He believed that the Vietnamese could not be civilized until their thinking, customs and institutions mirrored those of the French. According to Hue Tam Ho Tai, if Sarraut's argument was carried to its logical conclusion, the Vietnamese, she writes, would "deserve independence from French rule only when they no longer desired to be Vietnamese, but Frenchmen in yellow skin."
Albert Sarraut supported actively the preservation and development of native arts, for instance supporting the French art scholar George Groslier in preserving Cambodian arts and cultural traditions, and funding the design and construction of the National Museum of Cambodia.
On 18 January 1920 he replaced Henry Simon as Minister of the Colonies. 

On 10 July 1940, Sarraut voted in favour of granting the Cabinet presided over by Marshal Philippe Pétain authority to draw up a new constitution, thereby effectively ending the French Third Republic and establishing Vichy France. Thereafter Sarraut retired from politics. He took control of the family newspaper, La Dépêche de Toulouse, after the editor, his brother Maurice Sarraut, was killed by the Milice in 1943. 

Sarraut died in Paris on 26 November 1962. The Lycée Albert Sarraut in Hanoi was named after him.

Sarraut's First Ministry, 26 October – 26 November 1933
 Albert Sarraut – President of the Council and Minister of Marine
 Albert Dalimier – Vice President of the Council and Minister of Justice
 Joseph Paul-Boncour – Minister of Foreign Affairs
 Édouard Daladier – Minister of War
 Camille Chautemps – Minister of the Interior
 Georges Bonnet – Minister of Finance
 Abel Gardey – Minister of Budget
 Eugène Frot – Minister of Labour and Social Security Provisions
 Jacques Stern – Minister of Merchant Marine
 Pierre Cot – Minister of Air
 Anatole de Monzie – Minister of National Education
 Hippolyte Ducos – Minister of Pensions
 Henri Queuille – Minister of Agriculture
 François Piétri – Minister of Colonies
 Joseph Paganon – Minister of Public Works
 Émile Lisbonne – Minister of Public Health
 Jean Mistler – Minister of Posts, Telegraphs, and Telephones
 Laurent Eynac – Minister of Commerce and Industry

Sarraut's Second Ministry, 24 January – 4 June 1936
 Albert Sarraut – President of the Council and Minister of the Interior
 Pierre Étienne Flandin – Minister of Foreign Affairs
 Louis Maurin – Minister of War
 Marcel Régnier – Minister of Finance
 Ludovic-Oscar Frossard – Minister of Labour
 Léon Bérard – Minister of Justice
 François Piétri – Minister of Marine
 Louis de Chappedelaine – Minister of Merchant Marine
 Marcel Déat – Minister of Air
 Henri Guernut – Minister of National Education
 René Besse – Minister of Pensions
 Paul Thellier – Minister of Agriculture
 Jacques Stern – Minister of Colonies
 Camille Chautemps – Minister of Public Works
 Louis Nicolle – Minister of Public Health and Physical Education
 Georges Mandel – Minister of Posts, Telegraphs, and Telephones
 Georges Bonnet – Minister of Commerce and Industry
 Joseph Paul-Boncour – Minister of State and Permanent Delegate to the League of Nations

Further reading
 .

References

Sources

External links
 

1872 births
1962 deaths
Politicians from Bordeaux
Radical Party (France) politicians
Prime Ministers of France
Ministers of Marine
French Ministers of Overseas France
French interior ministers
French Ministers of National Education
Members of the 8th Chamber of Deputies of the French Third Republic
Members of the 9th Chamber of Deputies of the French Third Republic
Members of the 10th Chamber of Deputies of the French Third Republic
Members of the 11th Chamber of Deputies of the French Third Republic
Members of the 12th Chamber of Deputies of the French Third Republic
French Senators of the Third Republic
Senators of Aude
Governors-General of French Indochina
Ambassadors of France to Turkey
20th-century French newspaper publishers (people)